Ivor J. Watts (28 November 192419 March 2006) was a Welsh postman, and professional rugby league footballer who played in the 1940s, 1950s and 1960s, and coached in the 1970s. He played for Hull FC from 1945–1960, and also represented Cumberland from 1952–1953. Ivor's last match for Hull FC was playing at Wembley on 14 May 1960 in the 1959–60 Challenge Cup Final against Wakefield Trinity in which Hull FC lost 5–38. After his last match he was then appointed assistant-coach from 1960–1970. He became head-coach from 1970–1971 after Johnny Whiteley resigned. During the time Ivor coached Hull F.C. they won 28 out of 45 matches and lost 17. The highest win was 47–5 against Doncaster.

Playing career
Ivor Watts playing career started when he moved to Kingston upon Hull in 1945 and joined Hull FC. He then played for them from 1945 until 1960. In between his time at Hull FC he also represented his former city's, Cumberland from 1952–1953 playing 12 times and scoring 3 tries. With 214 tries, Ivor Watts is second in Hull FC's all-time try scoring list, behind Clive Sullivan with 250 tries. Also he is Hull FC top try scorer for local derby matches against Hull Kingston Rovers, with Kirk Yeaman just behind him.

Watts played, and scored a try in Hull FC's 10-10 draw with Halifax in the 1955–56 Yorkshire County Cup Final during the 1955–56 season at Headingley Rugby Stadium, Leeds on Saturday 22 October 1955.

Watts played , i.e. number 5, in Hull FC's 13-30 defeat by Wigan in the 1958–59 Challenge Cup Final during the 1958–59 season at Wembley Stadium, London on Saturday 9 May 1959.

Post playing
After working as assistant-coach from 1959 to 1970, from 1970 to 1971 Watts was Hull FC's head-coach.

References

External links

1924 births
2006 deaths
Cumbria rugby league team players
Hull F.C. coaches
Hull F.C. players
Rugby league players from Rhondda Cynon Taf
Rugby league wingers
Welsh rugby league coaches
Welsh rugby league players